Allen Township is a township in Warren County, Iowa, in the United States.

History
It is named for Captain James Allen.

References

Townships in Warren County, Iowa
Townships in Iowa